Svirsk is a town in Irkutsk Oblast, Russia, located on the left bank of the Angara River  northwest of Irkutsk. Population:    21,000 (1974).

History
Svirsk was granted town status in 1949.

Administrative and municipal status
Within the framework of administrative divisions, it is incorporated as the Town of Svirsk—an administrative unit with the status equal to that of the districts. As a municipal division, the Town of Svirsk is incorporated as Svirsk Urban Okrug.

Sport
Nikita Tyukhay from Svirsk is training Chinese boys and girls in bandy as well as China national bandy team.

References

Notes

Sources

Cities and towns in Irkutsk Oblast